The Municipality of Sveta Trojica v Slovenskih Goricah is a municipality in the traditional region of Styria in northeastern Slovenia. The seat of the municipality is the town of Sveta Trojica v Slovenskih Goricah.

Sveta Trojica v Slovenskih Goricah became a municipality in 2006.

Settlements
In addition to the municipal seat of Sveta Trojica v Slovenskih Goricah, the municipality also includes the following settlements:
 Gočova
 Osek
 Spodnja Senarska
 Spodnje Verjane
 Zgornja Senarska
 Zgornje Verjane
 Zgornji Porčič

References

External links

Municipality of Sveta Trojica v Slovenskih Goricah on Geopedia
Municipality of Sveta Trojica v Slovenskih Goricah website

Sveta Trojica v Slovenskih Goricah
2006 establishments in Slovenia